Bark mantis is a common name given to various species of praying mantis, especially those with cryptic camouflage resembling tree bark.  Examples include:
Gyromantis kraussii (spiny bark mantis)
Gyromantis occidentalis (eastern bark mantis)
Paraoxypilus sp. (boxer bark mantises)
Tarachodes sp. (Afrotropical bark mantises)
Theopompa sp. (Asian bark mantises)

See also
Dead leaf mantis
Flower mantis
Grass mantis
Leaf mantis
Shield mantis
Stick mantis
List of mantis genera and species

References

Mantodea
Insect common names